Akram Saad (born 22 November 1994) is an Egyptian handball player for Zamalek SC and the Egyptian national team.

He represented Egypt at the World Men's Handball Championship in 2019, and 2021.

Honours

Club

National titles

Zamalek

 Egyptian Handball League: 3
 Champions: 2018–19, 2019–20, 2020–21.

Heliopolis
 Egyptian Handball Cup: 1 
 Champions: 2017.

International titles

Zamalek
 African Handball Champions League: 3 
 Champions: 2017, 2018, 2019 

 African Handball Super Cup: 3
 Champions: 2018, 2019, 2021

National team
 African Men's Handball Championship: 1 
 Champions: 2020

References

1994 births
Living people
Egyptian male handball players
Competitors at the 2022 Mediterranean Games
Mediterranean Games silver medalists for Egypt
Mediterranean Games medalists in handball
21st-century Egyptian people